Ivo Lukačovič (born February 7, 1974, in Prague) is a Czech entrepreneur, founder and chairman of Seznam.cz, an Internet portal in the Czech Republic. According to Forbes magazine he is the 15th richest person in the Czech Republic with assets of around $350 million.

Biography 
Lukačovič was born in Prague and studied at the Czech Technical University in Prague, but terminated his studies after seven years. In 1995 he started to write code for a web directory (in Perl) and since 1996 he has run the directory at Seznam.cz.

In 2011 he started Citationtech, which creates 3D maps from air pictures and in 2014 developed Windy.com, a global server for analyzing wind.

Between 2010 and 2015 he reconstructed a historical Lockheed Electra 10A, which had previously been owned by J.A. Baťa. In 2015, the airplane was flown from Toronto to Točná Airport, where it became part of the private collection.

In 2016 he reacquired a 100% stake in his company Seznam.cz.

Windy.com 
Ivo Lukačovič founded Windy.com, which provides a real-time meteorological map and can view 35 different weather phenomena. It was founded in 2014, and originally started as an amateur project. As of May 2018 it had a team of six employees, and 300,000 users visiting the site per day.

References 

1974 births
Businesspeople from Prague
Living people
Czech bloggers
Male bloggers
Seznam.cz